Cold Light is a 2011 novel by Australian novelist Frank Moorhouse which won the 2012 Queensland Literary Award. The novel forms the third part of the author's "Edith Trilogy", following Grand Days that was published in 1993, and Dark Palace that was published in 2000.

Notes

 Dedication: To David Elliott Gyger, OAM, editor, opera critic - my first mentor, who, when I was young, introduced me to all that is best in traditional American liberal values, arts, thought and manners - and much more.  And to Owen Harris, professor, foreign affairs analyst, editor, ambassador, friend and advisor over many years and, together with his wife, Dorothy, charming dinner table companions.

Reviews

 The Monthly
 The Sydney Morning Herald

Awards and nominations

 2012 shortlisted Barbara Jefferis Award 
 2012 shortlisted Miles Franklin Literary Award 
 2012 winner Queensland Literary Award
 2013 longlisted International Dublin Literary Award
 2013 shortlisted New South Wales Premier's Literary Awards — Christina Stead Prize for Fiction 
 2014 winner Adelaide Festival Awards for Literature — Award for Fiction

References 

2011 Australian novels
Novels by Frank Moorhouse
Random House books